Oraesia triobliqua is a species of moth of the family Erebidae first described by Max Saalmüller in 1880. It is found in northern Madagascar.

It has a wingspan of 40 mm.

References

Calpinae
Moths described in 1880
Moths of Madagascar
Moths of Africa